María Genoveva Rivero Giménez is a pageant titleholder, was born in Quíbor, Venezuela in 1958. She is the Miss World Venezuela titleholder for 1976, and was the official representative of Venezuela to the Miss World 1976 pageant held in London, United Kingdom, when she classified in the Top 15 semifinalists.

Rivero competed in the national beauty pageant Miss Venezuela 1976 and obtained the title of Miss World Venezuela. She represented the Lara state.

References

External links
Miss Venezuela Official Website

1958 births
Living people
Miss World 1976 delegates